Krajmir (d. 15 June 1389) was a Serbian nobleman who served Prince Lazar (r. 1373–89), with the title of vojvoda (general). He was mentioned in Konstantin Mihailović's memoirs (1490–1501) regarding the Battle of Kosovo (1389), where he was captured and killed together with Lazar by the Ottomans, in front of Bayezid. He was described as being from Toplica.  His person has been connected with Krajko, the son of magnate Jovan Oliver (1310–1356). It is likely that he is the same as Milan Toplica from folk tradition.

See also
Pavle Orlović
Ivan Kosančić
Miloš Obilić

References

Sources

14th-century Serbian nobility
Medieval Serbian military leaders
14th-century births
1389 deaths